IFK Åmål is a Swedish football club located in Åmål in Västra Götaland County.

Background
Idrottsföreningen Kamraterna Åmål is a sports club from Åmål that was founded in 1908.  The club specialises in football and handball.  At one time the club also participated in bandy and in 1959 played in Sweden's top division.  The football club played in Sweden's second-highest division in the 1927/28 season.

Since their foundation IFK Åmål has participated mainly in the middle and lower divisions of the Swedish football league system.  The club currently plays in Division 2 Norra Götaland which is the fourth tier of Swedish football. They play their home matches at the Örnäsvallens IP in Åmål.

IFK Åmål are affiliated to Dalslands Fotbollförbund.

Recent history
In recent seasons IFK Åmål have competed in the following divisions:
2018 - Division III, Västra Svealand
2017 - Division III, Västra Svealand
2016 - Division IV, Bohuslän/Dalsland
2015 - Division III, Nordvästra Götaland
2014 – Division II, Norra Götaland
2013 – Division II, Norra Götaland
2012 – Division III, Nordvästra Götaland
2011 – Division III, Nordvästra Götaland
2010 – Division IV, Bohuslän/Dal
2009 – Division IV, Bohuslän/Dal
2008 – Division III, Nordvästra Götaland
2007 – Division IV, Bohuslän/Dal
2006 – Division IV, Bohuslän/Dal
2005 – Division IV, Bohuslän/Dal
2004 – Division IV, Bohuslän/Dal
2003 – Division IV, Bohuslän/Dal
2002 – Division V, Dalsland
2000 – Division IV, Bohuslän/Dal
1999 – Division IV, Bohuslän/Dal

Attendances

In recent seasons IFK Åmål have had the following average attendances:

Footnotes

External links
 IFK Åmål – Official website
 IFK Åmål on Facebook

Sport in Västra Götaland County
Football clubs in Västra Götaland County
Association football clubs established in 1908
Bandy clubs established in 1908
1908 establishments in Sweden
Idrottsföreningen Kamraterna
Defunct bandy clubs in Sweden